Russell Haswell (born 1970, Coventry) is an English multidisciplinary artist.

He has exhibited conceptual and wall-based visual works, video art, public sculpture, as well as audio presentations in both art gallery and concert hall contexts. Extreme Computer Music is one specialized area of activity. An ongoing collaboration (2003 +) with Florian Hecker working with Iannis Xenakis' graphic-input 'UPIC Music Composing System' is one project, the recorded results have been presented in the form of multi channel electroacoustic diffusion sessions, for example for the Frieze Art Fair. He has collaborated with: Aphex Twin, Jake and Dinos Chapman, Florian Hecker, Earth, Popol Vuh, Kjetil Manheim, Carsten Höller, Mika Vainio, Carl Michael von Hausswolff, Masami Akita, Peter Rehberg, Zbigniew Karkowski, Gescom, Yasunao Tone and Whitehouse.

In 2002 his debut compact disc Live Salvage 1997–2000 (Mego) received Prix Ars Electronica Honorable Mention for Digital Musics. In 2005 and 2006 he curated two London-based All Tomorrow's Parties club events, entitled 'Easy to Swallow', intended for the "broad-minded" the events showcased: Carl Michael von Hausswolff, Yasunao Tone + Hecker, Mark Stewart and the Maffia, Aphex Twin, Whitehouse, Surgeon + Regis Present: British Murder Boys, Lee Dorrian, Pita, Earth, Autechre, Robert Hood (ex-Underground Resistance).

In 2009 he contributed a cover of the Wild Planet song "Cabasa Cabasa" to the Warp20 (Recreated) compilation.

Selected discography
 (2001) Russell Haswell: Live Salvage 1997 -> 2000 (Mego) digipak + jewel case compact disc
 (2002) Masami Akita & Russell Haswell: Satanstornade (Warp Records) digipak compact disc + 12 inch album
 (2005) Haswell & Hecker: Revision (Mego) single sided 12 inch
 (2007) Haswell and Hecker: Blackest Ever Black (Warner Classics & Jazz) CD, Album
 (2008) Haswell & Hecker: UPIC Warp Tracks (Warp)  CD
 (2008) Russell Haswell: Second Live Salvage (Editions Mego)  2 x 12 inch vinyl
 (2009) Russell Haswell: Wild Tracks (Editions Mego)  CD, Album
 (2011) Russell Haswell: In It (Immersive Live Salvage) (Editions Mego) LP + DVD
(2013) Russell Haswell & Yasunao Tone: Convulsive Threshold (Editions Mego) CD
 (2013) Russell Haswell & Regis Concrete Fence 12" white vinyl

References

  2. Physical Presence of Noise: Interview with Russel Haswell

External links
Artists webpage

British experimental musicians
1970 births
Living people
Warp (record label) artists
English contemporary artists